In chemical processing, a packed bed is a hollow tube, pipe, or other vessel that is filled with a packing material.  The packing can be randomly filled with small objects like Raschig rings or else it can be a specifically designed  structured packing.  Packed beds may also contain catalyst particles or adsorbents such as zeolite pellets, granular activated carbon, etc.

The purpose of a packed bed is typically to improve contact between two phases in a chemical or similar process.  Packed beds can be used in a chemical reactor, a distillation process, or a scrubber, but packed beds have also been used to store heat in chemical plants.  In this case, hot gases are allowed to escape through a vessel that is packed with a refractory material until the packing is hot.  Air or other cool gas is then fed back to the plant through the hot bed, thereby pre-heating the air or gas feed.

Applications

Packed column 
In industry, a packed column is a type of packed bed used to perform separation processes, such as absorption, stripping, and distillation. A packed column is a pressure vessel that has a packed section.

Columns used in certain types of chromatography consisting of a tube filled with packing material can also be called packed columns and their structure has similarities to packed beds.

Column structure: random and stacked packed columns 
The column can be filled with random dumped packing (creating a random packed column) or with structured packing sections, which are arranged or stacked (creating a stacked packed column). In the column, liquids tend to wet the surface of the packing and the vapors pass across this wetted surface, where mass transfer takes place. Packing material can be used instead of trays to improve separation in distillation columns. Packing offers the advantage of a lower pressure drop across the column (when compared to plates or trays), which is beneficial while operating under vacuum. Differently shaped packing materials have different surface areas and void space between the packing. Both of these factors affect packing performance.

Liquid and vapor distribution (vapor to liquid ratio) 
Another factor in performance, in addition to the packing shape and surface area, is the liquid and vapor distribution that enters the packed bed. The number of  theoretical stages required to make a given separation is calculated using a specific vapor to liquid ratio. If the liquid and vapor are not evenly distributed across the superficial tower area as it enters the packed bed, the liquid to vapor ratio will not be correct and the required separation will not be achieved. The packing will appear to not be working properly. The height equivalent to a theoretical plate (HETP) will be greater than expected. The problem is not the packing itself but the mal-distribution of the fluids entering the packed bed. These columns can contain liquid distributors and redistributors which help to distribute the liquid evenly over a section of packing, increasing the efficiency of the mass transfer. The design of the liquid distributors used to introduce the feed and reflux to a packed bed is critical to making the packing perform at maximum efficiency.

Packed column vapor-equilibrium curve 
Packed columns have a continuous vapor-equilibrium curve, unlike conventional tray distillation in which every tray represents a separate point of vapor-liquid equilibrium. However, when modeling packed columns it is useful to compute a number of theoretical plates to denote the separation efficiency of the packed column with respect to more traditional trays. In design, the number of necessary theoretical equilibrium stages is first determined and then the packing height equivalent to a theoretical equilibrium stage, known as the height equivalent to a theoretical plate (HETP), is also determined. The total packing height required is the number theoretical stages multiplied by the HETP.

Packed bed reactors
Packed bed reactors can be used in chemical reactions in chemical industries. These reactors are tubular and are filled with solid catalyst particles, most often used to catalyze gas reactions. The chemical reaction takes place on the surface of the catalyst. The advantage of using a packed bed reactor is the higher conversion per weight of catalyst than other catalytic reactors. The conversion is based on the amount of the solid catalyst rather than the volume of the reactor.

Theory

The Ergun equation can be used to predict the pressure drop along the length of a packed bed given the fluid velocity, the packing size, and the viscosity and density of the fluid.

The Ergun equation, while reliable for systems on the surface of the earth, is unreliable for predicting the behavior of systems in microgravity. Experiments are currently underway aboard the International Space Station to collect data and develop reliable models for in-orbit packed-bed reactors.

Monitoring of packed columns/beds

The performance of a packed bed is highly dependent on the flow of material through it, which in turn is dependent on the packing and how the flow is managed. Electrical tomography may be used to observe the distribution of liquids at different cross sections of the vessel, or indeed the flow pattern throughout the packed column. Depending on the nature of the materials, capacitance or resistance tomography may be used.

See also

Height of a theoretical plate (HETP)
Continuous distillation
Kozeny-Carman equation
Fluidized bed
Industrial Tomography Systems
Dixon rings
Random column packing

Bibliography

References

Distillation
Chemical equipment